Vladimir Gustavovich Groman (21 February, 1874, Khalturino – 11 March, 1940) was a Menshevik economist active in Gosplan, the Soviet Union's central economic planning agency and the Central Statistical Directorate.

Groman was the son of a German father and Russian mother. He joined the Menshevik faction of the Russian Social Democratic Labour Party in 1905. He was exiled to Tver Oblast where he developed his statistical methods.

First World War
Groman was concerned with rising food prices which started following the outbreak of the First World War. He was involved in the 'Committee to Study the Current High Prices' set up by the Chuprov Society. In 1915 the Tsarist authorities were concerned about the disorganisation of the economy and set up the Special Council on Food Supply, to which Gorman was appointed as representative of the Union of Cities. In 1916 he worked with the Kadet, Mitrofan Voronkov to lobby for a lower fixed price for grain: originally over-ruled by Minister of Agriculture, Aleksei Bobrinsky, a spokesperson for landed interest, they would not let the matter drop and when the Minister of War, Dmitry Shuvayev became involved, Bobrinsky's policy was overthrown and Voronkov became a much quoted spokesperson on the topic.

Russian Revolution
Following the February Revolution he started work on developing a national economic plan. Groman was responsible for proposing the foundation of the All-Russian Food-Supply Council, also known as the Council of Ten which provided a politically neutral institution to manage food supply. Following the Bolshevik seizure of power, the Council of Ten tried to maintain their authority over food supply but were arrested on 27 November, being quickly released once they had accepted the authority of the Council of People's Commissars.

As an economist in the Soviet Union 
In 1922 he joined Gosplan, where he collaborated closely with Vladimir Bazarov. Groman was arrested in 1930 and was put on trial in 1931 as part of the 1931 Menshevik Trial. After deliberating for twenty-five hours, the court sentenced him to ten years' imprisonment.

References

1874 births
1940 deaths
People from Kirov Oblast
Russian people of German descent
Soviet people of German descent
Russian Social Democratic Labour Party members
Mensheviks
Marxian economists
Soviet economists
Russian statisticians
Imperial Moscow University alumni
1931 Menshevik Trial
People from the Russian Empire